Hangzhou railway station ( or ) is located in Shangcheng District, Hangzhou, Zhejiang Province of China. It is affiliated to Shanghai Railway Bureau, and is also the terminal of the Shanghai–Hangzhou Railway. The station is ranked first-class.

History

The station was first built in 1906 as a stop along the Jiang-Shu railway, and at that time was called "Qing Tai Men Station". It was opened on 23 August 1907 as the railway was put into use. Because the station was hundreds of meters away from Hangzhou City at that time, the residents inside the city found it inconvenient. Thus, Ma Yifu, a scholar returning from America, suggested the station move into the city. The building of the in-town station started in 1909 and was completed the following year. In 1937, the Sino-Japanese War began. The station was bombarded twice in October by the Japanese, and Hangzhou was occupied on 24 December. During the Japanese occupation in Hangzhou, the station was rebuilt from 26 March 1941 to 21 March 1942.

As the passenger load continuously grew, the station's capacity could hardly cope with the future demands. Thus the old station building was pulled down in summer 1997, and a new one was erected and put into use on 28 December 1999.

See also 
Hangzhou East railway station
Hangzhou South railway station
Hangzhou Metro

References

External links

Hangzhou Railway Station 
Hangzhou Train Travel Guide and Timetable 

Railway stations in Zhejiang
Buildings and structures in Hangzhou
Railway stations in China opened in 1907
Stations on the Shanghai–Kunming Railway
Stations on the Shanghai–Hangzhou high-speed railway